Cleadale is a settlement on the north west side of the island of Eigg, in the Small Isles of Scotland and is in the council area of Highland. The setting is visually dramatic.

References

Populated places in Lochaber
Villages in the Inner Hebrides
Eigg